Kevin Leyers (born 22 July 1984), better known as DJ Rebel or at times just Rebel, is a Belgian DJ and record producer based in Antwerp and known for electro house, progressive house, big room house and Latin house music.

Biography
He has already been successful in Belgian night venues and the Belgian charts since 2008 when he released his bootleg release "Put Your Bucovina Up" remixing Ian Oliver's "Bucovina". Starting 2009, he has had a great number of hits in the Belgian charts the biggest being the Latin hit "Cuba" reaching number 7 in Belgium in 2011 and appearing on the German charts.

Rebel released his studio album Rebel & Friends after appearing in the Belgian Summerfestival under that name.

Rebel gained his biggest international chart success though through his 2014 remake of Klaus Badelt's 2005 composition "He's a Pirate" from the film Pirates of the Caribbean: The Curse of the Black Pearl through his 2014 remix titled "Black Pearl (He's a Pirate)" featuring Sidney Housen. It has been a hit in France reaching No. 4 and in Switzerland reaching No. 9 in addition to becoming a hit in Belgium.

Discography

Albums
2013: Rebel & Friends

Singles

*Did not appear in the official Belgian Ultratop 50 charts, but rather in the bubbling under Ultratip charts. For Ultratip peaks, added 50 positions to arrive at an equivalent Ultratop position in above tables

Featured in

*Did not appear in the official Belgian Ultratop 50 charts, but rather in the bubbling under Ultratip charts.

References

External links
Official website
Facebook

Belgian DJs
Belgian house musicians
Living people
People from Edegem
1984 births
Musicians from Antwerp